Silver City Cemetery may refer to:

 Silver City Cemetery (Tuttle, Oklahoma), listed on the National Register of Historic Places in Grady County, Oklahoma
 Silver City Cemetery (Utah), listed on the National Register of Historic Places in Juab County, Utah
 Silver City Cemetery (Lewis and Clark County, Montana)
 Silver City Cemetery (Silver City, South Dakota)

See also
 Silver City Historic District (disambiguation)